San Remo may refer to:

Places
 Sanremo, a city in Liguria, Italy
 San Remo, New South Wales, a town in New South Wales, Australia
 San Remo, Victoria, a town in Victoria, Australia
 San Remo, Western Australia, a suburb of Mandurah, Australia
 San Remo, New York, a hamlet in Suffolk County, New York, USA

Other uses
 Romulus of Genoa (Saint Romulus), bishop of Genoa after whom the town of Sanremo was named

 The San Remo, an apartment building in New York City
 Hôtel San Rémo, former name of Oyo Hotel & Casino, Las Vegas

 San Remo conference, 1920 peace conference in Sanremo, Italy
 Sanremo Music Festival, held annually in Sanremo, Italy
 Rallye Sanremo, a rally competition held in Sanremo, Italy

 San Remo (company), an Australian pasta company
 San Remo Manual, short name for San Remo Manual on International Law Applicable to Armed Conflicts at Sea, a manual on naval warfare (1994)
 San Remo Golden Strings, 1960s Detroit soul orchestra 
 San Remo, a fictional city in the TV series Petrocelli